Jake Kelly (born 1995) is a British and Manx former road and track cyclist.

Cycling career
Kelly won the team pursuit at the 2015 British National Track Championships.

He represented the Isle of Man at the 2018 Commonwealth Games, finishing 32nd in the road race and 21st in the time trial.

Major results
2015
 1st  Team pursuit, National Track Championships (with Germain Burton, Mark Stewart & Oliver Wood)
2016
 4th Rutland–Melton International CiCLE Classic

References

1995 births
Living people
British male cyclists
British track cyclists
People from Douglas, Isle of Man
Cyclists at the 2018 Commonwealth Games
Manx male cyclists
Manx people
Commonwealth Games competitors for the Isle of Man